Occult Grandmaster Now in Christ is a book written by Nigerian author and occultist Iyke Nathan Uzorma. The volume one was published in 1993 by Gcee Bruno Concept.

References

Nigerian books
Occult books
Demonological literature
1993 books